Armand Raymond (January 12, 1913 – January 22, 1993) was an American professional ice hockey defenseman who played 22 games in the National Hockey League for the Montreal Canadiens.

External links

1913 births
1993 deaths
American ice hockey defensemen
Ice hockey people from New York (state)
Montreal Canadiens players
People from Mechanicville, New York
Providence Reds players